The Frauen-Bundesliga 1996–97 was the 7th season of the Frauen-Bundesliga, Germany's premier football league. It was the last season, in which the first league was divided into two divisions. Beginning with the 1997–98 season all Bundesliga teams played in a single division. As the new uniform league had eight spaces less than the divided Bundesliga, eight teams had to play in the qualification with the champions of the Regionalligas.

In the final the leaders of the northern division met. Grün-Weiß Brauweiler defeated FC Rumeln-Kaldenhausen 4–3 on penalties. Previously the regular time had ended goalless. In the extra time Rumeln-Kaldenhausen had taken an early lead, but Brauweiler had equalized late in the game. It was Brauweiler's only championship.

Northern division

Final standings

Results

Southern division

Final standings

Results

Semi-finals

Final

Top scorers

Qualification

Group 1

Group 2

Group 3

Group 4

Sources 
 "West Germany (Women) 1996/97". Rec.Sport.Soccer Statistics Foundation. 15 January 2005. Retrieved 2009-07-22.

1996-97
Ger
1
Women